Mohammedia is a city in Morocco.

Mohammedia, Mohammadia, or a variant thereof, may also refer to:


Places

Algeria
Mohammedia, Algiers, a suburb of capital Algiers 
Mohammadia, Mascara, a town in Mascara Province, site of Ancient Castra Nova (Mauretania), now a Latin Catholic titular see 
Mohammedia District, Mascara Province

Tunisia
Mohamedia, Tunisia, a town

Sports 
 SA Mohammadia, a football club based in Mohammadia, Mascara, Algeria
 SCC Mohammédia, a football club based in Mohammedia, Morocco

See also
 Mohammedan, a follower of Islamic prophet Muhammad